The Battle of Calcinato took place near the town of Calcinato in Lombardy, Italy on 19 April 1706 during the War of the Spanish Succession between a French-led force under the duc de Vendôme and an Imperial  army under Graf von Reventlow. It resulted in a French victory.

Background
By 1706, France and its allies controlled most of Northern Italy and the Savoyard territories of Villefranche and the County of Savoy, now part of modern-day France. Victor Amadeus retained only his capital Turin, while the Imperial army's attempt to relieve him was blocked at Cassano in August 1705. However, the French did not have enough men to properly invest the city, allowing it to be substantially reinforced and the two armies went into winter quarters. 

In early 1706, Prince Eugene went to Vienna to obtain men and financing for the next campaign, leaving the Danish general Count von Reventlow in command of the Imperial army at Montichiari and Calcinato. Each position was individually strong but too far apart for mutual support, the 12,000 mostly German troops at Calcinato being 11 kilometres away from their comrades at Montichiari. 

The French spent the winter around Castiglione and Mantua; in April, Marshall La Feuillade took 40,000 men to besiege Turin. Vendôme pretended to be ill and short of supplies to give the impression he was not ready to move; then on 18 April, he took 18,000 infantry and 5,000 cavalry and marched on Calcinato overnight, reaching the Canal De Lonato at day break on 19 April.

The battle
While he achieved a considerable degree of surprise, the French had to cross the canal before moving uphill to attack the Imperials. This delay gave von Reventlow time to organise his defence although he was handicapped by the fact most of the Imperial artillery was at Gavardo. Vendôme used his own guns to cover the assault; the French right charged the Imperialist left using their bayonets and pushed it back. Von Reventlow and his cavalry rallied them but then his own right gave way; given the gap between his positions and those at Montichiari, this threatened to cut him off from Salò. He gave the order to withdraw but as was often the case, what started as an orderly retreat soon degenerated into a rout. Imperialist casualties included 3,000 dead or wounded, most of their baggage and up to 3,000 taken prisoner.

Aftermath
Although Vendôme captured Gavardo and Salo and drove the Imperial forces into the Trentino valley, Prince Eugene returned in time to rally them; he then led them around Lake Garda and into the Province of Verona. The war in Italy now turned against the French; defeat at Ramillies in May meant Vendôme and all available forces were moved to Northern France. At the same time, the Imperial army in Italy was substantially reinforced, the Maritime Powers  paying for another 20,000 German auxiliaries, while renewing the existing agreement with Prussia.

Footnotes

References

Sources
 Bancks, John; The history of Francis-Eugene Prince of Savoy; (1745);
 Lynn, John A. The Wars of Louis XIV, 1667–1714. Longman, (1999). 
 Somerville, Thomas; The History of Great Britain During the Reign of Queen Anne; (1795, Forgotten Books 2018 ed);

Calcinato
Calcinato
Calcinato
Conflicts in 1706
1706 in the Habsburg monarchy
1706 in France
1706 in Italy
Calcinato